The gens Triccia was an obscure plebeian family at ancient Rome.  No members of this gens are mentioned by Roman writers, but a few are known from inscriptions.

Members
 Lucius Triccius Epaphroditus, buried in the first-century sepulchre of Decciana Olympias and her family at Canusium in Apulia.
 Lucius Triccius Apollinaris, a man of duumviral rank at Canusium in AD 223.  Perhaps the father of Lucius Triccius Apollinaris, junior, a youth named in the same inscription.
 Lucius Triccius Apollinaris, junior, a young man living at Canusium in AD 223, listed amongst the praetextati.  Perhaps the son of Lucius Triccius Apollinaris, a man of duumviral rank named in the same inscription.

See also
 List of Roman gentes

References

Bibliography
 Theodor Mommsen et alii, Corpus Inscriptionum Latinarum (The Body of Latin Inscriptions, abbreviated CIL), Berlin-Brandenburgische Akademie der Wissenschaften (1853–present).
 René Cagnat et alii, L'Année épigraphique (The Year in Epigraphy, abbreviated AE), Presses Universitaires de France (1888–present).

Roman gentes